The Sanggai Yumpham was a fortified royal residence (citadel) of the Meitei royalties inside the Kangla Fort in Imphal. It is presently preserved as an archaeological site as well as one of the tourist attractions in the Kangla.

Etymology 
In Meitei language, "sanggāi" means residence or home, used in formal context.  
The Meitei term "yumpham" literally means "the place where a house is built". Morphologically, "yum‑pham" can be divided into two root words, "yum" and "pham", meaning "house" and "place" respectively.

History 
The construction of the Citadel of the Kangla Fort in Imphal started in the year 1611 A.D. during the era of Meitei king Khagemba. This fact is recorded in the Cheitharol Kumbaba, the Royal chronicle of the Meitei royalties of Kangleipak.

The Kangla Fort was destroyed and abandoned multiple times during Burmese invasion, especially during the Chahi Taret Khuntakpa (1819-1826). Later, the citadel was re-constructed during the reign of Meitei king Chandrakirti Singh in 1873.

As a result of the Anglo Manipur War of 1891, on 27 April 1891, General Maxwell annexed the Kangla and the citadel was demolished simultaneously.

Features 

The citadel is situated inside the enclosed area of the inner brick wall. Its area is around 600 x 600 feet. Its walls are 14 to 20 feet high. There are 4 guarding posts (pillars) in the 4 corners of 4 directions. 
The southern passageway door leads to the Govindajee Temple of the Kangla.
It is constructed by using well-burnt bricks. It houses many holy sites, including the coronation site of Pakhangba. It has three main entrance gates. Two entrance gates are on the western side and one entrance gate is on the southern side. The entrance gate situated on the left end of the western face lies directly opposite to the Royal Coronation Hall. The entrance gate situated at the right end of the same wall lies facing the Court Room (Darbar Hall). The southern entrance gate is well connected with a passageway leading to the Shree Govindajee Temple of the Kangla.

It is surrounded by five walls of the Kangla Fort. The innermost wall is the only one that is standing still today. There is one octagonal watchtower at every corner of the wall, serving as sentry posts. Its entire perimeter has military installations (emplacements) of around 500 defender soldiers.

There was an old bridge built over the Imphal River from the passageway between the Sanggai Yumpham and the Govindajee Temple inside the Kangla. Later, it got deteriorated in 1891. During the 28th meeting of the Kangla Fort Board, on 15 December 2018, Nongthombam Biren Singh, the Chief Minister of Manipur, took a decision that a new bridge will be constructed similar to the features of the old bridge.

See also 
 Kangla Sanathong
 Statue of Meidingu Nara Singh
 Hijagang
 Iputhou Pakhangba Laishang
 Manung Kangjeibung
 Museums in Kangla
 Kangla Nongpok Torban

Notes

References

External links 

 
 
 
 

Meitei architecture
Royal residences in India
Tourist attractions in Manipur
Buildings and structures in Imphal
Monuments and memorials to Meitei people
Monuments and memorials to Meitei royalties